is a railway station on the Gotōji Line in Iizuka, Fukuoka, Japan, operated by Kyushu Railway Company (JR Kyushu).

Lines
Chikuzen-Shōnai Station is served by the Gotōji Line.

Adjacent stations

See also
 List of railway stations in Japan

External links

  

Railway stations in Fukuoka Prefecture
Railway stations in Japan opened in 1926